The Loyola Greyhounds women's lacrosse team is an NCAA Division I college lacrosse team representing Loyola University Maryland as part of the Patriot League. They play their home games at Ridley Athletic Complex in Baltimore, Maryland.

Historical statistics
*Statistics through 2018 season

Individual career records

Reference:

Individual single-season records
Reference:

Seasons
References:

Postseason Results

The Greyhounds have appeared in 20 NCAA tournaments. Their postseason record is 18-20.

References